Pitoy is both a given name and a surname. Notable people with the name include:

Pitoy Moreno (1925–2018), Filipino fashion designer
Jendri Pitoy (born 1981), Indonesian football goalkeeper

See also
Pitot